St. John F.C. is a football club based in Jersey in the Channel Islands, which was founded in 1919. They are affiliated with the Jersey Football Association and play in the Jersey Football Combination Championship. Their ground hosted matches during the 2015 Island Games, including a match between Jersey and The Isle of Man which attracted 1,800 fans. Jersey born Youtuber Chris Dixon (known by his online alias "ChrisMD") played for St. John F.C. and dedicated a series of videos about his and the clubs past seasons. On June 11th St. John played Hashtag United in an exhibition match at Springfield Stadium which was won by Hashtag 3-1

References

Football clubs in Jersey